The Irish Rugby Football Union (IRFU) is the body managing rugby union in the island of Ireland (both Republic of Ireland and Northern Ireland). The IRFU has its head office at 10/12 Lansdowne Road and home ground at Aviva Stadium, where adult men's Irish rugby union international matches are played. In addition, the Union also owns the Ravenhill Stadium in Belfast, Thomond Park in Limerick and a number of grounds in provincial areas that have been rented to clubs.

History
Initially, there were two unions: the Irish Football Union, which had jurisdiction over clubs in Leinster, Munster and parts of Ulster and was founded in December 1874, and the Northern Football Union of Ireland, which controlled the Belfast area and was founded in January 1875. The IRFU was formed in 1879 as an amalgamation of these two organisations and branches of the new IRFU were formed in Leinster, Munster and Ulster. The Connacht Branch was formed in 1900.

The IRFU was a founding member of the International Rugby Football Board, now known as World Rugby, in 1886 with Scotland and Wales. (England refused to join until 1890.)

Following the partition of Ireland in to what is now the Republic of Ireland (an independent country) and Northern Ireland (administered by the United Kingdom), the then Committee of the Irish Rugby Football Union decided that it would continue to administer its affairs on the basis of the full 32 Irish counties and the traditional four provinces of Ireland: Leinster (12 counties), Ulster (9 counties), Munster (6 counties), and Connacht (5 counties).

This led to the unusual, but not unique, situation among international rugby union teams, where the Irish representative teams are drawn from players from two separate political, national territories: Ireland (an independent, sovereign state) and Northern Ireland (a part of the United Kingdom). To maintain the unity of Irish rugby union and the linkages between North and South, the IRFU purchased a new ground in 1923 in the Ravenhill district of Belfast at a cost of £2,300. The last full International at Ravenhill involving Ireland for more than a half-century took place in 1953–54 against Scotland who were victorious by 2 tries (6 points) to nil. Australia played Romania in the 1999 World Cup at the ground. The next full International played at Ravenhill was the Rugby World Cup warm-up match against Italy in August 2007 due to the temporary closure of Lansdowne Road for reconstruction.

The four provincial branches of the IRFU first ran cup competitions during the 1880s. Although these tournaments still take place every year, their significance has been diminished by the advent of an All-Ireland league of 48 Senior Clubs in 1990.

The four provincial teams have played an Interprovincial Championship since the 1920s and continue to be the focal point for players aspiring to the international level. These are Munster, Leinster, Ulster and Connacht. All four provinces play at the senior level as members of the United Rugby Championship.

Logos and emblems

The Irish Rugby Football Union represents the island of Ireland and the emblems and symbols it uses have reflected its association with the whole of the island of Ireland since its formation. Some elements have changed since 1874, but what has remained consistent throughout the history of the union is the use of the shamrock in its emblems. Originally the Shamrock was a five-sprig emblem covering most of the lefthand side of the jersey and this was used until the 1898 game against England in when it was replaced with a white shield with a sprig of four similar sized shamrocks.

In 1927 a new crest was introduced, with the shamrock design altered to a sprig of three shamrocks of a similar size within a smaller white shield. This was the official crest until 1974 when the centenary logo was used, and which continued to be used with only a slight modification made in 2010.

Logos used on the official match programmes from the 1920s to 1954, showing a single shamrock surrounded by an oval had no relation to the official jersey emblem. The only time an Irish jersey had a single shamrock was when the Ireland side toured Chile and Argentina in 1952 and Argentina in 1970, and in both series no caps were awarded.

Although the use of the shamrock has been a constant, albeit with modifications to design, other elements of symbology have changed. In the early twenties, when the Irish Free State was established, the union was left in the position of governing a game for one island containing two separate political entities. A controversy ensued as to what flag should be flown at international matches. For a side that played both in Dublin and Belfast (the former being in the Free State, the latter being politically part of the United Kingdom) this posed a significant issue.

In 1925 the union designed their own flag, incorporating the arms of the four provinces. Although it had the same elements as the Flag of the Four Provinces, it was not identical, instead having them separated on a green background with the IRFU logo in the centre. Even so, the call to fly the Irish tricolour at Lansdowne Road continued. In 1932, despite the IRFU insisting that only the IRFU flag was flown at home internationals, pressure continued such that the Minister for External Affairs in the Free State asked to meet with the president of the Union. The result was that on 5 February 1932, the IRFU unanimously voted to fly both the flag of the union and the national flag at Lansdowne Road at all international matches in Dublin. The IRFU flag, as designed in 1925, is that which is still used by the Ireland rugby union side, albeit with the logo updated in the middle.

At the 2011 Rugby World Cup, the Ireland team entered the field of play at the beginning of their matches with the Irish tricolour and the Flag of Ulster.

Affiliation
There are currently approximately 95,000 rugby players in total in Ireland. There are 56 clubs affiliated to the Ulster Branch; 71 to the Leinster Branch; 59 to the Munster Branch and 23 to the Connacht Branch. In addition, there are 246 schools playing rugby: Ulster (107), Leinster (75), Munster (41) and Connacht (23).

The IRFU also has an Exiles branch tasked with developing "Ireland-qualified" players (i.e., eligible to play internationally for Ireland through ancestry) living in England, Scotland and Wales. Volunteers provide coaching, administration and development under the supervision of a paid development manager.

National teams
Ireland national rugby union team
Ireland Wolfhounds
Emerging Ireland
Ireland national under-20 rugby union team
Ireland national schoolboy rugby union team
Ireland national rugby sevens team
Ireland women's national rugby union team

See also

Rugby Players Ireland
Connacht Rugby
Leinster Rugby
Munster Rugby
Ulster Rugby
Irish Universities Rugby Union

Notes and references

External links
 
 IrishRugby.net

 
Rugby union, Ireland
1879 establishments in Ireland
Rugby union
World Rugby members
Sports organizations established in 1879